Bhadrakali may refer to:

Bhadrakali, Hindu goddess
Bhadrakali (film), 1976 Tamil film
Bhadrakali, Nepal, village in Nepal
 Bhadrakali, Hooghly, neighbourhood in Uttarpara Kotrung, India

See also

Bhadrakali Temple, Warangal in Warangal, Telangana